In Holland is a 1929 American short comedy film.

External links

1929 short films
1929 comedy films
Films directed by Norman Taurog
1920s English-language films
American comedy short films
American black-and-white films